Oliver Gordon Purnell Jr. (born May 19, 1953) is an American former college basketball coach.  He served as the head men's basketball coach at Radford University from 1988 to 1991, Old Dominion University from 1991 to 1994, the University of Dayton from 1994 to 2003, Clemson University from 2003 to 2010, and DePaul University from 2010 to 2015, compiling a career record of 448–386.

Early years
Purnell was born in Berlin, Maryland, the second of Oliver Sr. and Phyllis' four children. He attended Stephen Decatur High School, where he played on the boys' basketball team that captured the Maryland Public Secondary Schools Athletic Association Class B championship in 1970. Purnell was recruited to play basketball at Old Dominion University in Norfolk, Virginia.  While at Old Dominion, Purnell enjoyed a highly successful playing career, finishing 18th on ODU's all-time scoring list with 1,090 points and leading the Monarchs to the 1975 NCAA Division II national championship.
That year, Purnell was selected by Converse as an honorable mention Division II All-American.

Purnell averaged 14.4 points a game his senior year and 13.8 as a junior. He scored 25 points against Randolph-Macon in the NCAA South Atlantic Regional Championship game in 1975. As a junior, he averaged 6.7 assists per game and tallied 181 for the season. He was accorded the team MVP honors his senior year.

Purnell also dished out 474 career assists, which placed him sixth on the school's all-time list. He still shares ODU's single game steal record with eight against Washington and Lee in 1975.

Purnell was drafted in the sixth round of the 1975 NBA draft by the Milwaukee Bucks.

Purnell was inducted into the Stephen Decatur High School Hall of Fame on September 19, 2008. He was inducted into the ODU Sports Hall of Fame in April 1988.

Coaching career
Purnell became a graduate assistant coach at ODU in July 1975, eventually becoming a full-time assistant at the university.  During Purnell's tenure as a full-time assistant, he helped ODU reach the postseason seven times (3 NCAAs and 4 NITs). Lefty Driesell hired Purnell in 1985 to serve as an assistant on his Maryland staff.  Purnell served three seasons at Maryland before being selected as head coach at Radford University.  Purnell is credited with one of the biggest one year turnarounds in NCAA history as his 1990-91 Radford club posted a 22-7 record, a 15-game improvement over the previous season. In 1991, he returned to Old Dominion to take the head coaching position.  After another successful stint, in 1994, he accepted a position as head coach at the University of Dayton where he led the Flyers to two NCAA tournament appearances (2000, 2003) before accepting the head coaching job at Clemson University shortly after the #4 seeded Flyers lost to #13 Tulsa in the first round of the 2003 NCAA tournament. Purnell was the head coach of the 1999 USA World University Team and led the squad to an 8-0 record and the Gold Medal in Brisbane, Australia. He was the recipient of USA Basketball's 1999 Developmental Coach of the Year Award for that accomplishment. He was selected to the Board of Directors at the 1998 convention for the National Association of Basketball Coaches (NABC). In 2000, he was appointed by the NABC to serve as a member of USA Basketball Men's Collegiate Committee. That committee is responsible for the selection of collegiate coaches and players for USA Basketball's teams.

During his tenure at Clemson, he built the program steadily, improving each subsequent season. He served as president of the National Association of Basketball Coaches in 2006–07. At the conclusion of that season, Purnell took his team to the championship game of the NIT, losing to West Virginia in the final, following wins against Syracuse, Air Force, and Ole Miss.  In 2008, he guided the Tigers to a third-place 10–6 record in the Atlantic Coast Conference and a runner-up position in the ACC Tournament in Charlotte, losing to North Carolina by 5 points.  The 2007–08 season marked Clemson's first appearance in the NCAA Tournament in ten years. However, Purnell was unable to win an NCAA tournament game (0–6) during his stints with ODU, Dayton and Clemson.

On March 18, 2008, Clemson extended Purnell's contract through 2014 and raised his salary.

On April 6, 2010, Purnell signed a seven-year deal with DePaul University.  At the conclusion of the 2014–2015 season, Purnell announced his resignation.

Head coaching record

References

External links
 DePaul profile

1953 births
Living people
African-American basketball coaches
African-American basketball players
American men's basketball coaches
American men's basketball players
Basketball coaches from Maryland
Basketball players from Maryland
Clemson Tigers men's basketball coaches
College men's basketball head coaches in the United States
Dayton Flyers men's basketball coaches
DePaul Blue Demons men's basketball coaches
Maryland Terrapins men's basketball coaches
Milwaukee Bucks draft picks
Old Dominion Monarchs men's basketball coaches
Old Dominion Monarchs men's basketball players
People from Berlin, Maryland
Radford Highlanders men's basketball coaches
21st-century African-American people
20th-century African-American sportspeople